Alex Eala and Oksana Selekhmeteva were the defending champions, but Selekhmeteva is no longer eligible to participate in junior events, whilst Eala chose not to participate.

Sára Bejlek and Lucie Havlíčková won the title, defeating Nikola Bartůňková and Céline Naef in the final, 6–3, 6–3.

Seeds

Draw

Finals

Top half

Bottom half

References

External links 
Draw at rolandgarros.com
Draw at ITFtennis.com

Girls' Doubles
French Open by year – Girls' doubles